Ryuji Goto (born 10 September 1931) is a Japanese rower. He competed in the men's coxed four event at the 1952 Summer Olympics.

References

External links
 

1931 births
Possibly living people
Japanese male rowers
Olympic rowers of Japan
Rowers at the 1952 Summer Olympics
Place of birth missing (living people)